Jeffrey T. Bury (born 1970) is an American geographer and researcher focused on the natural and social transformations in Latin America caused by globalization processes.

Background
Bury grew up in Salt Lake City, Utah and received a BA in Political Science from the University of Utah in 1993, and an MA in International Affairs from The American University in 1995 (with an early study of carbon sequestration politics). He received his PhD in Geography at University of Colorado at Boulder in 2002 with a dissertation on The Political Ecology of Transnational Mining Corporations and Livelihood Transformation in Cajamarca Peru, supervised by Anthony Bebbington.

From 2003 to 2006 He was assistant professor at San Francisco State University. Since 2006, he has been Associate Professor at the Department of Environmental Studies at University of California at Santa Cruz.

Bury publishes in English, Spanish and has limited proficiency in Quechuan.

Scholarly work
Bury has been tracing the interaction between mining projects, rural livelihood systems, and environmental change in the Peruvian Andes since the late 1990s. Over this time, the pace of mining has increased, as has local resistance to it.

He is also part of a large NSF project, "Hydrologic Transformation and Human Resilience to Climate Change in the Peruvian Andes."

Awards
2014: Golden Apple Award (education) Division of Social Sciences, UCSC.

Major Publications
Bebbington, A.J. and Bury, J. in press 2013. Subterranean Struggles: New Geographies of Extractive 
Industries in Latin America. University of Texas-Austin Press.

External links
 Jeffrey T. Bury, University of California at Santa Cruz

References

1970 births
American social scientists
American geographers
Political ecologists
University of Utah alumni
American University School of International Service alumni
University of Colorado Boulder alumni
University of California, Santa Cruz faculty
San Francisco State University faculty
Living people